Rustlers' Ranch is a 1926 American silent Western film directed by Clifford Smith and starring Art Acord, Olive Hasbrouck and Duke R. Lee.

Plot

Cast
 Art Acord as Lee Crush 
 Olive Hasbrouck as Lois Shawn 
 Duke R. Lee as Boggs 
 George Chesebro as Bud Harvey 
 Edith Yorke as Mary Shawn 
 Matty Kemp as Clem Allen 
 Stanton Heck as Bull Dozier 
 Lillian Worth as Tessie 
 Ned Bassett as Sheriff Collins

References

Bibliography
 Munden, Kenneth White. The American Film Institute Catalog of Motion Pictures Produced in the United States, Part 1. University of California Press, 1997.

External links
 

1926 films
1926 Western (genre) films
1920s English-language films
Universal Pictures films
Films directed by Clifford Smith
American black-and-white films
Silent American Western (genre) films
1920s American films
Films with screenplays by Richard Schayer